Rectipalpula is a monotypic moth genus of the family Erebidae and subfamily Erebinae. It was seen as a synonym for Oxyodes, but is now considered a separate genus. Its single species, Rectipalpula billeti, is found in northern India, Vietnam, Thailand, Sundaland and Sulawesi. It is frequent over an altitude range from sea level to about 2000 m, the species has been recorded from forested, disturbed and cultivated areas. Both the genus and the species were first described by Joseph de Joannis in 1900.

References

Moths of Borneo
Monotypic moth genera